The 1926 Big Ten Conference football season was the 31st season of college football played by the member schools of the Big Ten Conference (also known as the Western Conference) and was a part of the 1926 college football season.

Season overview

Results and team statistics

Key
DS = Ranking in the Dickinson System, a system used at the time to rank the country's best college football teams and to award the Knute Rockne Trophy to the national champion
PPG = Average of points scored per game
PAG = Average of points allowed per game

All-conference players

The following players received first-team honors on the 1932 All-Big Ten Conference football team from at least two of the following selectors: Associated Press (AP), United Press (UP), Billy Evans (BE), and Walter Eckersall (WE).

 Bennie Oosterbaan, end, Michigan (AP, UP, BE, WE)
 Roger B. Wheeler, end, Minnesota (AP, BE, WE)
 Spike Nelson, tackle, Iowa (AP, BE)
 Leo Raskowski, tackle, Ohio State (UP, WE)
 Robert W. Johnson, tackle, Northwestern (BE, WE)
 Ed Hess, guard, Ohio State (AP, UP, BE, WE)
 Bernie Shively, guard, Illinois (AP, BE, WE)
 Robert Reitsch, center, Illinois (AP, UP, WE)
 Benny Friedman, quarterback, Michigan (AP, UP, BE, WE)
 Ralph Baker, halfback, Northwestern (AP, UP, BE, WE)
 Marty Karow, halfback, Ohio State (AP, UP, WE)
 Herb Joesting, Minnesota (AP, UP, BE, WE)

All-Americans

Five Big Ten players were recognized as consensus first-team players on the 1926 College Football All-America Team:

 Bennie Oosterbaan, end, Michigan (AAB, COL, NEA, UP, CEP, WC, BE, ES, WE)
 Bernie Shively, guard, Illinois (AAB, AP, COL, INS, NEA, WC, BE, WE)
 Benny Friedman, quarterback, Michigan (AP, COL, INS, NEA, CP, NYS, BE, HF, LP, RG, ES, WE)
 Ralph Baker, halfback, Northwestern (AP, COL, CP, NYS, LP, WE)
 Herb Joesting, fullback, Minnesota (AAB, AP, COL, INS, NEA, BE, CP, ES, NYS, RG, LP, WC, WE)

References